The 1981 NCAA Men's Water Polo Championship was the 13th annual NCAA Men's Water Polo Championship to determine the national champion of NCAA men's college water polo. Tournament matches were played at the Belmont Plaza Pool in Long Beach, California during December 1981.

Stanford defeated Long Beach State in the final, 17–6, to win their fourth, and second consecutive, national title.

James Bergeson (Stanford) and Jody Campbell (Stanford) were named the Co-Most Outstanding Players of the tournament. An All-Tournament Team, consisting of seven players, was also named. 

Bergeson was also the tournament's leading scorer, with 12 goals.

Qualification
Since there has only ever been one single national championship for water polo, all NCAA men's water polo programs (whether from Division I, Division II, or Division III) were eligible. A total of 8 teams were invited to contest this championship.

Bracket
Site: Belmont Plaza Pool, Long Beach, California

{{8TeamBracket-Consols
| team-width=150
| RD3=First round
| RD4=Championship semifinals
| RD2=Consolation semifinals
| RD5=Championship
| RD5b=Third place
| RD1=Fifth place
| RD1b=Seventh place

| RD3-seed1= | RD3-team1=Stanford | RD3-score1=8
| RD3-seed2= | RD3-team2=Brown | RD3-score2=5
| RD3-seed3= | RD3-team3=UC Irvine | RD3-score3=9| RD3-seed4= | RD3-team4=UC Santa Barbara | RD3-score4=8
| RD3-seed5= | RD3-team5=Long Beach State | RD3-score5=15
| RD3-seed6= | RD3-team6=Air Force | RD3-score6=6
| RD3-seed7= | RD3-team7=California | RD3-score7=10
| RD3-seed8= | RD3-team8= UCLA | RD3-score8=7

| RD4-seed1= | RD4-team1=Stanford | RD4-score1=13
| RD4-seed2= | RD4-team2=UC Irvine | RD4-score2=6
| RD4-seed3= | RD4-team3=Long Beach State | RD4-score3=11| RD4-seed4= | RD4-team4=California | RD4-score4=9

| RD2-seed1= | RD2-team1=Brown | RD2-score1=6
| RD2-seed2= | RD2-team2=UC Santa Barbara | RD2-score2=16
| RD2-seed3= | RD2-team3=Air Force | RD2-score3=5
| RD2-seed4= | RD2-team4=UCLA | RD2-score4=16

| RD5-seed1= | RD5-team1=Stanford | RD5-score1=17
| RD5-seed2= | RD5-team2=Long Beach State | RD5-score2=6

| RD5b-seed1= | RD5b-team1=UC Irvine | RD5b-score1=10
| RD5b-seed2= | RD5b-team2=California | RD5b-score2=11

| RD1-seed1= | RD1-team1=UC Santa Barbara | RD1-score1=9| RD1-seed2= | RD1-team2=UCLA | RD1-score2=8

| RD1b-seed1= | RD1b-team1=Brown | RD1b-score1=9| RD1b-seed2= | RD1b-team2=Air Force | RD1b-score2=8
}}

 All-tournament team James Bergeson, Stanford (Co-Most outstanding player)Jody Campbell, Stanford''' (Co-Most outstanding player)
Dave George, UC Santa Barbara
Chris Kelsey, Stanford
Alan Mouchawar, Stanford
Vince Vanelli, Stanford
John Vargas, UC Irvine

See also 
 NCAA Men's Water Polo Championship

References

NCAA Men's Water Polo Championship
NCAA Men's Water Polo Championship
1981 in sports in California
December 1981 sports events in the United States
1981